The 36th (Ulster) Division was an infantry division of the British Army, part of Lord Kitchener's New Army, formed in September 1914. Originally called the Ulster Division, it was made up of mainly members of the Ulster Volunteer Force, who formed thirteen additional battalions for three existing regiments: the Royal Irish Fusiliers, the Royal Irish Rifles and the Royal Inniskilling Fusiliers. However, regular Officers and Soldiers and men from all around the United Kingdom made up the strength of the Division. The division served from October 1915 on Western Front as a formation of the British Army during the Great War.

The division's insignia was the Red Hand of Ulster.

History

Formation
The Ulster Volunteers were a unionist militia founded in 1912 to block Home Rule for Ireland. In 1913 they organised themselves into the Ulster Volunteer Force to give armed resistance to the prospective Third Home Rule Act (enacted in 1914). Many Ulster Protestants feared being governed by a Catholic-dominated parliament in Dublin and losing their local supremacy and strong links with Britain. Sir Edward Carson, one of the unionist leaders, made an appeal to Ulster Volunteers to come forward for military service. Kitchener hoped for a Brigade (four battalions), he got a whole division (three Brigades). Major-General Oliver Nugent took command of the regiment in September 1915 and it moved to France in October 1915.

Engagements

The Somme, 1916
The 36th Division was one of the few divisions to make significant gains on the first day on the Somme. It attacked between the Ancre and Thiepval against a position known as the Schwaben Redoubt. According to military historian Martin Middlebrook:

During the Battle of the Somme the Ulster Division was the only division of X Corps (United Kingdom) to have achieved its objectives on the opening day of the battle. This came at a heavy price, with the division suffering in two days of fighting 5,500 officers and enlisted men killed, wounded or missing. War correspondent Philip Gibbs said of the Division, "Their attack was one of the finest displays of human courage in the world.

Of nine Victoria Crosses given to British forces in the battle, four were awarded to 36th Division soldiers.

Actions of 36th Division

Thiepval – Somme

The 36th Ulster Division's sector of the Somme lay astride the marshy valley of the river Ancre and the higher ground south of the river. Their task was to cross the ridge and take the German second line near Grandcourt. In their path lay not only the German front line, but just beyond it, the intermediate line within which was the Schwaben Redoubt.

The First Day of the Somme was the anniversary (Julian Calendar) of the Battle of the Boyne, a fact remarked on by the leaders of the Division. Stories have often been told that some men wore orange sashes into battle. According to David Hume: "There was many who went over the top at the Somme who were Ulstermen, at least one, Sergeant Samuel Kelly of 9th Inniskillings wearing his Ulster Sash, while others wore orange ribbons". Martin Middlebrook recounts a story that when some of his men wavered, one Company commander from the West Belfasts, Maj. George Gaffikin, took off his Orange Sash, held it high for his men to see and roared the traditional war-cry of the battle of the Boyne; " Come on, boys! No surrender!" However, historians Robin Prior and Trevor Wilson, quoting Northern Irish historian Keith Jeffery, state categorically that such stories are myths.

On 1 July, following the preliminary bombardment, the Ulstermen quickly took the German front line, but intelligence was so poor that, with the rest of the division attacking under creep bombardment (artillery fired in front or over men; they advance as it moves) the Ulstermen would have come under attack from their own bombardment in the German first line.

But they still advanced, moving to the crest so rapidly that the Germans had no time to come up from their dugouts (generally 30–40 feet below ground). In the Schwaben Redoubt, which was also taken, so successful was the advance that by 10:00 some had reached the German second line. But again they came under their own barrage, not due to finish until 10:10. However, this successful penetration had to be given up before nightfall, as it was unmatched by those at its flanks. The Ulstermen were exposed in a narrow salient, open to attack on three sides. They were running out of ammunition and supplies, and a full German counter-attack at 22:00 forced them to withdraw, giving up virtually all they gained.

The division had suffered over 5,000 casualties and 2,069 deaths. The Thiepval Memorial commemorates the 1916 Anglo-French offensive on the Somme and the men who died there, including those from the 36th (Ulster) Division. It is the biggest British war memorial to the missing of the Western Front, both in physical size and the numbers it commemorates (more than 73,000). It was built in the late 1920s to early 1930s.

Ulster Memorial Tower

The Ulster Memorial Tower was unveiled by Field-Marshal Sir Henry Wilson in Thiepval, France, on 19 November 1921, in dedication to the contributions of the 36th Ulster Division during World War I. The tower marks the site of the Schwaben redoubt, against which the Ulster Division advanced on the first day of the Battle of the Somme.

Lord Carson had intended to perform the unveiling himself but, due to illness, his place was taken by Field Marshal Sir Henry Wilson. The money was raised by public subscription in Northern Ireland in memory of the officers and men of the 36th (Ulster) Division, and all Ulstermen who died in the great war.

The tower itself is a replica of Helen's Tower at Clandeboye, County Down. It was at Helen's Tower that the men of the then newly formed Ulster Division drilled and trained on the outbreak of World War I. For many of the men of the 36th (Ulster) Division, the distinctive sight of Helen's Tower rising above the surrounding countryside was one of their last abiding memories of home before their departure for England and, subsequently, the Western Front.

Messines, 1917

The 36th Division was deeply involved in the fighting around Spanbroekmolen on the first day of the Battle of Messines (7–14 June 1917). Many of its men are buried in Spanbroekmolen British Cemetery and Lone Tree Commonwealth War Graves Commission Cemetery on Messines Ridge.

Victoria Cross Recipients 

In total, nine members of the 36th Division were awarded the Victoria Cross:
 Captain Eric Norman Frankland Bell, 9th Battalion The Royal Inniskilling Fusiliers. Died 20 years old, 1 July 1916, Battle of the Somme.
 2nd Lieutenant James Samuel Emerson, 9th Battalion The Royal Inniskilling Fusiliers. Died 22 years old, 6 December 1917, La Vacquerie.
 Lance Corporal Ernest Seaman, 2nd Battalion The Royal Inniskilling Fusiliers. Died 25 years old, 29 September 1918, Terhand Belgium, he also was awarded the Military Medal
 Fusilier Norman Harvey, 1st Battalion The Royal Inniskilling Fusiliers. Awarded for actions during 25 October 1918, Ingoyghem, Belgium.
 Second Lieutenant Edmund De Wind, 15th Battalion The Royal Irish Rifles. Died 34 years old, 21 March 1918, Second Battle of the Somme.
 Rifleman William Frederick McFadzean, 14th Battalion The Royal Irish Rifles. Died 20 years old, 1 July 1916, Battle of the Somme.
 Rifleman Robert Quigg, 12th Battalion The Royal Irish Rifles. Awarded for actions during the Battle of the Somme on 1 July 1916. Also awarded the Medal of Order of St. George (Fourth Class), the highest honour of the Russian Empire.
 Lieutenant Geoffrey Cather 9th Battalion The Royal Irish Fusiliers. Died 25 years old, 2 July 1916, Battle of the Somme.
 Cecil Leonard Knox 150th Field Company Royal Engineers awarded 22 March 1918 at Tugny-et-Pont, Aisne, awards

Commendations 

Captain Wilfred Spender of the Ulster Division's HQ staff after the Battle of the Somme was quoted in the press as saying,

and

After the war, King George V paid tribute to the 36th Division saying,

Winston Churchill

Colonel John Buchan (History of War)

North of Theipval the Ulster Division broke through the enemy trenches, passed the crest of the ridge, and reached the point called the Crucifix, in rear of the first German position. For a little while they held the strong Schwaben Redoubt (where), enfiladed on three sides, they went on through successive German lines, and only a remnant came back to tell the tale. Nothing finer was done in the war. The splendid troops drawn from those Volunteers who had banded themselves together for another cause, now shed their blood like water for the liberty of the world."

 Richard Doherty

Whether town dweller or country lad, volunteer or regular, officer or other rank, Catholic or Protestant, the Sons of Ulster knew a comradeship and a trust in adversity that should be a lesson to us all.

Order of battle
The following units served with the division:
 107th Brigade
 8th (Service) Battalion (East Belfast), the Royal Irish Rifles
 9th (Service) Battalion (West Belfast), the Royal Irish Rifles
 Both of the above will almagalmate in September 1917 to form 8/9th Battalion the Royal Irish Rifles
 10th (Service) Battalion (South Belfast), the Royal Irish Rifles (until February 1918)
 15th (Service) Battalion (North Belfast), the Royal Irish Rifles
 1st Battalion, the Royal Irish Fusiliers (from August 1917 until February 1918)
 1st Battalion, the Royal Irish Rifles (from February 1918)
 2nd Battalion, the Royal Irish Rifles (from February 1918)
 107th Brigade Machine Gun Company (from 18 December 1915, moved into 36 MG Bn 1 March 1918)
 107th Trench Mortar Battery (from 1 April 1916)

Between 6 November 1915 and 7 February 1916 the brigade swapped with the 12th Brigade from the 4th Division.

 108th Brigade 
 9th (Service) Battalion, the Royal Irish Fusiliers
 12th (Service) Battalion (Central Antrim), the Royal Irish Rifles
 2nd Battalion, the Royal Irish Rifles (from November 1917 to 107th Bde. February 1918)
 11th (Service) Battalion (South Antrim), the Royal Irish Rifles
 13th (Service) Battalion (County Down), the Royal Irish Rifles
 Both of the above will amalgamate and become the 11/13th Battalion the Royal Irish Rifles in November 1917 (disbanded February 1918)
 7th Battalion the Royal Irish Rifles (14 October - 14 November 1917- 14 October 1917 Absorbed into 2nd Battalion Royal Irish Rifles)
 1st Battalion, the Royal Irish Fusiliers (from 107th Bde. February 1918)
 108th Brigade Machine Gun Company (from 26 January 1916, moved into 36 MG Bn 1 March 1918)
 108th Trench Mortar Battery (from 1 April 1916)

In August 1917 the 11th and 13th battalions of the Royal Irish Rifles amalgamated to form the 11/13th Battalion, which disbanded in February 1918.

 109th Brigade
 9th (Service) Battalion (County Tyrone), the Royal Inniskilling Fusiliers
 10th (Service) Battalion (Derry), the Royal Inniskilling Fusiliers (disbanded January 1918)
 11th (Service) Battalion (Donegal and Fermanagh), the Royal Inniskilling Fusiliers (disbanded February 1918)
 14th (Service) Battalion (Young Citizens), the Royal Irish Rifles (disbanded February 1918)
 1st Battalion, the Royal Inniskilling Fusiliers (from February 1918)
 2nd Battalion, the Royal Inniskilling Fusiliers (from February 1918) ll
 109th Brigade Machine Gun Company (from 23 January 1916, moved into 36 MG Bn 1 March 1918)
 109th Trench Mortar Battery (from 1 April 1916).

Battles 
 Battle of Somme 1916 or Battle of Albert
 Battle of Messines (1917)
 Battle of Langemarck or Third Battle of Ypres
 Battle of Cambrai
 Battle of Saint Quentin
 Battle of Rossiers
 Battle of Lys
 Battle of Kemmel
 Battle of Messines 1918
 Battle of Bailleul
 Battle of Courtrai (1918)

Commanders
 1914–1915 Major-General C. H. Powell
 1915 – 6 May 1918 Major-General Oliver Nugent
 6 May 1918 – Disbandment Major-General Clifford Coffin

Great War Memorials

 Ulster Tower Memorial Thiepval, France.
 Irish National War Memorial Gardens, Dublin
 Island of Ireland Peace Park Messines, Belgium.
 Menin Gate Memorial Ypres, Belgium.

See also

 List of British divisions in World War I
 10th (Irish) Division
 16th (Irish) Division
 Observe the Sons of Ulster Marching Towards the Somme

References

Bibliography

Further reading

 Jonnie Armstrong: Walking with the Ulster Division, Ancre Books Limited (2012), 
 Thomas Bartlett & Keith Jeffery: A Military History of Ireland, Cambridge University Press (1996) (2006), 
 Desmond & Jean Bowen: Heroic Option: The Irish in the British Army, Pen & Sword Books (2005), .
 Timothy Bowman: Irish Regiments in the Great War: Discipline and Morale, Manchester University Press (2003), .
 
 Peter Hart The Somme, Weidenfeld and Nicolson (2005), 
 Steven Moore The Irish on the Somme, Local Press Belfast (2005), 
 David Murphy: Irish Regiments in the World Wars, Osprey Publishing (2007), 
 David Murphy: The Irish Brigades, 1685-2006, A gazetteer of Irish Military Service past and present, Four Courts Press (2007) The Military Heritage of Ireland Trust.

External links 
 The British Army in the Great War: The 36th (Ulster) Division
 South Belfast Friends Of The Somme
 The Somme Association
 The Irish War Memorials Project - listing of monuments throughout Ireland
 The Military Heritage of Ireland Trust
 Department of the Taoiseach: Irish Soldiers in the First World War
 The Great War

Infantry divisions of the British Army in World War I
Kitchener's Army divisions
Military units and formations established in 1914
Military units and formations disestablished in 1919
Ireland in World War I
Ulster Volunteers
1914 establishments in the United Kingdom